Eeva Maria Tolppanen (born 24 November 1952) is a Finnish politician, representing the Social Democratic Party in the Parliament of Finland. She has served in the Parliament since 2011 and in the City Council of Vaasa since 2013. Tolppanen formerly represented the Finns Party and got elected to the Parliament twice as a member of the party, but switched to the SDP in 2016.

References

Living people
1952 births
Finns Party politicians
Members of the Parliament of Finland (2011–15)
Members of the Parliament of Finland (2015–19)
Social Democratic Party of Finland politicians
21st-century Finnish women politicians
Women members of the Parliament of Finland
People from Kemi